Mind the Gaps is a state-level legislative campaign created by the Connecticut-based education advocacy organization ConnCAN (Connecticut Coalition for Achievement Now), an American think tank and state-level education advocacy group founded in January 2005, with offices in Hartford, Connecticut and New Haven, Connecticut. The stated goal of the campaign is to support "three commonsense school reforms—funding to grow high-performing public charter schools, teacher quality and education transparency—to help close Connecticut’s achievement gap."

The campaign was launched on February 5, 2009 alongside the website www.PleaseMindtheGaps.org. In its first official release, it uncovered budget gaps that it claimed would result in the loss of 695 seats for students in the state's charter schools. The website includes details of the policy agenda, a blog and a video produced by Kevin Munn featuring the principals of Elm City College Prep in New Haven, CT and Macdonough School in Middletown, CT.

Both the campaign name and logo reference the famous phrase Mind the Gap from the London Underground rapid transit system.

Among the 48 board and advisory board members are Richard C. Levin, president of Yale University, Allan Taylor, chair of the Connecticut State Board of Education, and Ron Howard, Co-Chairman of Imagine Entertainment.

External links
Mind the Gaps website
ConnCAN website (uses some Flash)
Campaign video

References

"Busy Day For My Blackberry and My Poor Hand." Shelly Sindland, Fox 61. February 5, 2009.
"ConnCAN launches a new blog." Fordham Foundation's Flypaper. February 5, 2009.

Advocacy groups in the United States